Alan Levin may refer to:
 Alan Levin (business), former CFO of Pfizer
 Alan Levin (filmmaker), filmmaker
 Alan Levin (internet governance), policy, research and development specialist involved in global Internet Governance
 Alan Levin (radio) (known on-air as Brother Wease), American radio personality

See also
Al Levine, baseball player
Allan Levine, Canadian author